Tweety is a yellow canary in the Warner Bros. Looney Tunes and Merrie Melodies series of animated cartoons. The name "Tweety" is a play on words, as it originally meant "sweetie", along with "tweet" being an English onomatopoeia for the sounds of birds. His characteristics are based on Red Skelton's famous "Junior the Mean Widdle Kid." He appeared in 46 cartoons during the golden age, made between 1942 and 1964.

Personality and identity 
Despite the perceptions that people may hold, owing to the long eyelashes and high-pitched voice (which Mel Blanc provided), Tweety is male although his ambiguity was played with. For example, in the cartoon "Snow Business", when Granny entered a room containing Tweety and Sylvester she said: "Here I am, boys!", whereas a 1952 cartoon was entitled Ain't She Tweet [emphasis added]. Also, his species is ambiguous; although originally and often portrayed as a young canary, he is also frequently called a rare and valuable "tweety bird" as a plot device, and once called "the only living specimen". Nevertheless, the title song of The Sylvester & Tweety Mysteries directly states that he is a canary. His shape more closely suggests that of a baby bird, which is what he was during his early appearances (although the "baby bird" aspect has been used in a few later cartoons as a plot device). The yellow feathers were added, but otherwise he retained the baby-bird shape.

In his early appearances in Bob Clampett cartoons, Tweety is a very aggressive character who tries anything to foil Sylvester, even kicking the cat when he is down. One of his most notable malicious moments is in the cartoon Birdy and the Beast, where a cat chases Tweety by flying until he remembers that cats cannot fly, causing him to fall. Tweety says sympathetically, "Awww, the poor kitty cat! He faw down and go (in a loud, tough, masculine voice) BOOM!!" and then grins mischievously. A similar use of that voice is in A Tale Of Two Kitties when Tweety, wearing an air raid warden's helmet, suddenly yells "Turn out those lights!"

Tweety's aggressive nature was toned down when Friz Freleng began directing the series, with the character more consistently played as a cutesy bird usually going about his business, and doing little to thwart Sylvester's ill-conceived plots, allowing them to simply collapse on their own; he became even less aggressive when Granny was introduced, but occasionally Tweety still showed a malicious side when egged on. Despite this, in comparison with other major Looney Tunes protagonists like Bugs Bunny and Foghorn Leghorn, Tweety was not given a complete character arc, instead embodying the "innocent child" role offsetting the motives of his superior Sylvester and their guardian figure.

Creation by Bob Clampett 

Bob Clampett created the character that would become Tweety in the 1942 short A Tale of Two Kitties, pitting him against two hungry cats named Babbit and Catstello (based on the famous comedians Abbott and Costello). On the original model sheet, Tweety was named Orson, which was also the name of a bird character from an earlier Clampett cartoon Wacky Blackout.

Tweety was created not as a domestic canary, but as a generic (and wild) baby bird in an outdoor nest: naked (pink), jowly, and also far more aggressive and saucy, as opposed to the later, better-known version of him as a less hot-tempered (but still somewhat ornery) yellow canary. In the documentary Bugs Bunny: Superstar, animator Clampett stated that Tweety had been based "on my own naked baby picture." Clampett did two more shorts with the "naked genius", as a Jimmy Durante-ish cat once called him in A Gruesome Twosome. The second Tweety short, Birdy and the Beast, finally bestowed the baby bird with his new name, and gave him his blue eyes.

Many of Mel Blanc's characters are known for speech impediments. One of Tweety's most noticeable is that /s/, /k/, and /g/ are changed to /t/, /d/, or (final s) /θ/; for example, "pussy cat" comes out as "putty tat", later rendered "puddy tat", "Granny" comes out as "Dwanny" and "sweetie pie" comes out as "tweetie pie" (a phonological pattern referred to as 'fronting'), hence his name. He also has trouble with liquid consonants: as with Elmer Fudd, /l/ and /r/ come out as /w/. In Canary Row and Putty Tat Trouble, he begins the cartoon by singing a song about himself, "I'm a tweet wittow biwd in a diwded tage; Tweety'th my name but I don't know my age, I don't have to wuwy and dat is dat; I'm tafe in hewe fwom dat ol' putty tat." (Translation: "I'm a sweet little bird in a gilded cage...") Aside from this speech impediment, Tweety's voice is that of Bugs Bunny's, one speed up (if The Old Grey Hare, which depicts Bugs as an infant, is any indication of that); the only difference is that Bugs does not have trouble pronouncing /s/, /k/ and /g/ as mentioned above.

Freleng takes over 
Clampett began work on a short that would pit Tweety against a then-unnamed, lisping black and white cat created by Friz Freleng in 1945. However, Clampett left the studio before going into full production on the short (which had a storyboard produced, where it was titled "Fat Rat and the Stupid Cat"), however Freleng would use Tweety in his own separate project. Freleng toned Tweety down and gave him a cuter appearance, resulting in his long-lashed blue-pupil eyes and yellow feathers. Clampett mentions in Bugs Bunny: Superstar that the feathers were added to satisfy censors who objected to the naked bird. The first short to team Tweety and the cat, later named Sylvester, was 1947's Tweetie Pie, which won Warner Bros its first Academy Award for Best Short Subject (Cartoons).

Sylvester and Tweety proved to be one of the most notable pairings in animation history. Most of their cartoons followed a standard formula:

 Sylvester wants to catch and eat Tweety, but some major obstacle stands in his way – usually Granny or her bulldog Hector (or occasionally, numerous bulldogs, or another cat who also wants to catch and eat Tweety).
 Tweety says his signature lines "I tawt I taw a puddy tat!" and "I did! I did taw a puddy tat!" (Originally, like in A Tale of Two Kitties, it was "I did! I taw a putty tat!", but the extra "did" got inserted, starting with Freleng's first cartoon, somehow). In later cartoons, such as Home, Tweet Home, Tweety says "I did! I did! I did taw a puddy tat!"
 Sylvester spends the entire film using progressively more elaborate schemes or devices to catch Tweety, similar to Wile E. Coyote in his ongoing efforts to catch the Road Runner, Tom's attempts to catch Jerry, and the Aardvark's attempts to catch the Ant. Of course, each of his tricks fail, either due to their flaws or, more often than not, because of intervention by either Hector the Bulldog or an indignant Granny, or after Tweety steers the enemy toward them or another device (such as off the ledge of a tall building or in front of an oncoming train).

In a few of the cartoons, Sylvester does manage to briefly eat Tweety up with a gulp. However, either Granny or another character makes him spit Tweety out right away. In the 1952 Christmas-themed short Gift Wrapped, Sylvester was also briefly eaten by Hector the Bulldog, and forced by Granny to spit him out; as punishment, both Sylvester and Hector were tied up with their mouths gagged shut.

In 1951, Mel Blanc (with Billy May's orchestra) had a hit single with "I Tawt I Taw a Puddy Tat", a song performed in character by Tweety and featuring Sylvester. In the lyrics Sylvester sings "I'd like to eat that Thweetie Pie when he leaves his cage", implying that Tweety's name is actually Sweetie Pie. Later the name "Sweetie Pie" was applied to the young, pink female canary in the Tiny Toon Adventures animated TV series of the early 1990s.

From 1945 until the original Warner Bros. Cartoons studio closed, Freleng had almost exclusive use of Tweety at the Warner cartoon studio (much like Yosemite Sam), with the exception of a brief cameo in No Barking in 1954, directed by Chuck Jones (that year, Freleng used Pepé Le Pew, a Jones character, for the only time in his career and the only time in a Tweety short, Dog Pounded).

Later appearances 
Tweety had a cameo role in Who Framed Roger Rabbit, making Eddie Valiant (Bob Hoskins) fall from a flag pole by playing "This Little Piggy" with Valiant's fingers and releasing his grip. The scene is essentially a re-creation of a gag from A Tale of Two Kitties, with Valiant replacing Catstello as Tweety's victim. This was the last time Mel Blanc voiced Tweety.

During the 1990s, Tweety also starred in the animated TV series The Sylvester and Tweety Mysteries, in which Granny ran a detective agency with the assistance of Tweety, Sylvester and Hector. In the series, Tweety has the starring role and is voiced by Joe Alaskey. The storyline carries into the 2000 direct-to-video feature-length animated film Tweety's High-Flying Adventure, where Joe Alaskey reprises his role. Tweety's prototype, Orson, also made an appearance in the series.

Tweety also appears in Tiny Toon Adventures as the mentor of Sweetie Pie, and one of the faculty at Acme Looniversity. He was voiced by Jeff Bergman for most of his appearances and Bob Bergen in “Animaniacs”.

In the 1995 cartoon short Carrotblanca, a parody/homage to Casablanca, Tweety appeared as "Usmarte", a parody of the character Ugarte played by Peter Lorre in the original film. In several sequences, Tweety was speaking and laughing in character like Peter Lorre. He also does the Looney Tunes ending instead of Porky Pig or Bugs Bunny. This is also notable for being a rare instance where Tweety plays a villain character. Bob Bergen voices the role again.

In 1996, Tweety (voiced by Bob Bergen again) appeared in the feature film, Space Jam, with legendary basketball player Michael Jordan.

In 2001, a younger version of Tweety appeared on Baby Looney Tunes, thus coming full circle from his earliest appearances. Here he was voiced by Sam Vincent.

In 2011, Tweety was featured, with his Looney Tunes co-stars, in Cartoon Network's series The Looney Tunes Show. He is voiced by Jeff Bergman. He appeared in the episode "Ridiculous Journey", where he and Sylvester work together with Taz to get back home to Granny and Bugs Bunny. He had been revealed to have fought in World War II alongside a young Granny. Sylvester also asked him how old he was, to which Tweety replied, "I'll never tell." Sylvester then asked if Tweety would at least tell him if he (Tweety) was a boy or a girl. Tweety whispered into his ear and Sylvester had a surprised expression and said "Huh, I was wrong."

Tweety has recently appeared as a major character in New Looney Tunes and Looney Tunes Cartoons, where his designs are mostly based on his Freleng heyday with a few Bob Clampett elements to make him more suited for 1942–1944, and his personality reverts him to being more violent and abusive in nature while being toned down to retain his cute facade. He was voiced again by Bob Bergen. Looney Tunes Cartoons is the second time that Eric Bauza voices Tweety.

On February 17, 2021, it was announced Tweety would star in Tweety Mysteries which would have been similar to The Sylvester & Tweety Mysteries. The series would have been a live-action/animated hybrid aimed towards girls and would have aired on Cartoon Network. However, the series never got off the ground as Cartoon Network announced all live-action productions were scrapped in December 2022.

Tweety starred in a direct-to-video film King Tweety which was released on June 14, 2022. Eric Bauza reprised the role.

Tweety appears in the preschool series Bugs Bunny Builders which aired as part of Cartoonito on Cartoon Network and HBO Max on July 25, 2022. Eric Bauza reprised his role from Looney Tunes Cartoons.

Merchandise 
Tweety and Sylvester have been used to endorse products such as Miracle Whip dressing and MCI Communications long distance. In 1998, the United States Post Office honored Tweety and Sylvester with a 32-cent postage stamp. Tweety also appears in products produced by Warner Brothers Studios.

Modern art 

British artist Banksy's 2008 New York art installation The Village Pet Store and Charcoal Grill features Tweety, an animatronic sculpture of an aged and molting version of the character. In honor of Tweety's 80th anniversary, Warner Bros. Discovery unveiled 80 themed murals done by artists from around the world.

Comic books 
Western Publications produced a comic book about Tweety and Sylvester entitled Tweety and Sylvester, first in Dell Comics Four Color series #406, 489, and 524, then in their own title from Dell Comics (#4–37, 1954–1962), then later from Gold Key Comics (#1–102, 1963–1972). 

In 2017, Tweety appeared in the DC Comics special, Catwoman/ Tweety and Sylvester, where Tweety teams up with Black Canary, who he just calls "bwonde wady".

In popular culture
There are two instances of the name "Tweety Bird" being used on real life birds, one being in 1955 with eight year old Lauren Girdsen naming a quail after the character, and another in 1964 when a two-year old named Timmy gave the name to a three-week old Ancona chicken.
Tweety was a write-in candidate name for the 1980 United States presidential election in Illinois.

Tweety's Looney Tunes and Merrie Melodies filmography

Directed by Bob Clampett 
 A Tale of Two Kitties (1942)
 Birdy and the Beast (1944)
 A Gruesome Twosome (1945)

Directed by Friz Freleng 
 Tweetie Pie (1947)
 I Taw a Putty Tat (1948)
 Bad Ol' Putty Tat (1949)
 Home Tweet Home (1950)
 All a Bir-r-r-d (1950)
 Canary Row (1950)
 Putty Tat Trouble (1951)
 Room and Bird (1951)
 Tweety's S.O.S. (1951)
 Tweet Tweet Tweety (1951)
 Gift Wrapped (1952)
 Ain't She Tweet (1952)
 A Bird in a Guilty Cage (1952)
 Snow Business (1953)
 Fowl Weather (1953)
 Tom Tom Tomcat (1953)
 A Street Cat Named Sylvester (1953)
 Catty Cornered (1953)
 Dog Pounded (1954)
 Muzzle Tough (1954)
 Satan's Waitin' (1954)
 Sandy Claws (1955)
 Tweety's Circus (1955)
 Red Riding Hoodwinked (1955)
 Heir-Conditioned (1955) – cameo appearance
 Tweet and Sour (1956)
 Tree Cornered Tweety (1956)
 Tugboat Granny (1956)
 Tweet Zoo (1957)
 Tweety and the Beanstalk (1957)
 Birds Anonymous (1957)
 Greedy for Tweety (1957)
 A Pizza Tweety Pie (1958)
 A Bird in a Bonnet (1958)
 Trick or Tweet (1959)
 Tweet and Lovely (1959)
 Tweet Dreams (1959)
 Hyde and Go Tweet (1960)
 Trip For Tat (1960)
 The Rebel Without Claws (1961)

Co-directed by Hawley Pratt 
 The Last Hungry Cat (1961)
 The Jet Cage (1962)

Directed by Gerry Chiniquy 
 Hawaiian Aye Aye (1964)

Directed by Chuck Jones 
 No Barking (1954) – cameo appearance

Post-Golden Age of American animation 
 Bugs Bunny's Looney Christmas Tales (1979), voiced by Mel Blanc
 Who Framed Roger Rabbit (1988), voiced by Mel Blanc
 Tiny Toon Adventures (1990), voiced by Jeff Bergman and Bob Bergen
 Carrotblanca (1995), voiced by Bob Bergen
 The Sylvester and Tweety Mysteries (1995), voiced by Joe Alaskey
 Superior Duck (1996), voiced by Eric Goldberg (cameo appearance)
 Space Jam (1996), voiced by Bob Bergen
 Tweety's High-Flying Adventure (2000), voiced by Joe Alaskey
 Baby Looney Tunes (2001), voiced by Samuel Vincent
 Looney Tunes: Back in Action (2003), voiced by Eric Goldberg
 Museum Scream (2004), voiced by Billy West
 Bah, Humduck! A Looney Tunes Christmas (2006), voiced by Bob Bergen
 The Looney Tunes Show (2011), voiced by Jeff Bergman
 I Tawt I Taw a Puddy Tat (2011), voiced by Mel Blanc (Archive Audio)
 New Looney Tunes (2015), voiced by Bob Bergen
 Looney Tunes Cartoons (2020), voiced by Eric Bauza
 Space Jam: A New Legacy (2021), voiced by Bob Bergen
 King Tweety (2022), voiced by Eric Bauza
 Bugs Bunny Builders (2022), voiced by Eric Bauza

Voice actors 
Legendary voice artist Mel Blanc originated the character's voice. After the Golden Age of American Animation came to an end, Blanc continued to voice the character in TV specials, commercials, music recordings, and films, such as 1988's Who Framed Roger Rabbit, which was one of Blanc's final projects as Tweety. Before and after Blanc's death in 1989, several voice actors have provided the voice in his stead. These voice actors are:

 Danny Kaye (1951 I Taut I Taw a Puddy Tat cover)
 Gilbert Mack (Golden Records records, Bugs Bunny Songfest)
 Jeff Bergman (The Earth Day Special, Tiny Toon Adventures, Tyson Foods commercial, Cartoon Network bumpers, Boomerang bumper, The Looney Tunes Show, Looney Tunes Dash, Daffy Duck Dance Off, Ani-Mayhem)
 Noel Blanc (You Rang? answering machine messages)
 Bob Bergen (Tiny Toon Adventures, Bugs Bunny's Birthday Ball, Looney Tunes River Ride, Yosemite Sam and the Gold River Adventure!, Sylvester and Tweety in Cagey Capers, Have Yourself a Looney Tunes Christmas, Carrotblanca, Space Jam, Bugs Bunny's Learning Adventures, Looney Tunes: Back in Action (video game), Bah, Humduck! A Looney Tunes Christmas, A Looney Tunes Sing-A-Long Christmas, Looney Tunes: Cartoon Conductor, Looney Tunes: Laff Riot pilot, New Looney Tunes, Looney Tunes: World of Mayhem, Space Jam: A New Legacy, various commercials)
 Keith Scott (Looney Tunes Musical Revue, Westfield commercial, HBF Insurance commercial, Spectacular Light and Sound Show Illuminanza, KFC commercials, Looney Tunes: We Got the Beat!, Looney Tunes on Ice, Looney Tunes LIVE! Classroom Capers, Christmas Moments with Looney Tunes, The Looney Tunes Radio Show, Looney Rock, Looney Tunes Christmas Carols)
 Greg Burson (Animaniacs, Warner Bros. Kids Club, Quest for Camelot promotion)
 Joe Alaskey (The Sylvester & Tweety Mysteries, Bugs & Friends Sing Elvis, Warner Bros. Sing-Along: Quest for Camelot, Warner Bros. Sing-Along: Looney Tunes, Tweety's High-Flying Adventure, The Looney Tunes Kwazy Christmas, Looney Tunes Dance Off, Looney Tunes ClickN READ Phonics, various video games, webtoons, and commercials)
 Frank Welker (chirping sounds in The Sylvester & Tweety Mysteries and Tweety's High-Flying Adventure)
 Eric Goldberg (Superior Duck, Looney Tunes: Back in Action)
 Samuel Vincent (Baby Looney Tunes, Baby Looney Tunes: Egg-straordinary Adventure)
 Tom Kenny (Twick or Tweety (as Vampire Tweety))
 Billy West (Museum Scream)
 Kevin Shinick (Mad)
 Patrick Warburton (Family Guy)
 Seth Green (Robot Chicken)
 Dee Bradley Baker (New Looney Tunes (monster form))
 Eric Bauza (Looney Tunes: World of Mayhem (monster form), Looney Tunes Cartoons, Bugs Bunny in The Golden Carrot, King Tweety, Bugs Bunny Builders)
 Tom Sheppard (Robot Chicken)

References

External links 

Looney Tunes characters
Fictional canaries
Film characters introduced in 1942
Fictional characters with speech impediment
Fictional anthropomorphic characters
Fictional World War II veterans
Male characters in animation